Daniel Jacob Barbir (born January 31, 1998) is an American professional soccer  player who plays as a defender for Oakland Roots in the USL Championship.

Early life
Barbir was born in Atlanta, Georgia, to a Cuban mother and Romanian father. He grew up in Macungie, Pennsylvania, and visited his relatives in Romania on several occasions.

Club career

Early years
Barbir signed his first professional contract with English club West Bromwich Albion in 2015, aged 17.

In early 2017, he joined Stoke City on trial, playing three matches and scoring one goal for their under-23 team.

Barbir joined United Soccer League side Whitecaps FC 2 on September 14, 2017. He only made three appearances, as WFC2 were dissolved two months later.

Astra Giurgiu
On February 19, 2018, Barbir agreed to a three-and-a-half-year deal with Astra Giurgiu in Romania.

Sporting Kansas City II 
Barbir signed with USL Championship side Sporting Kansas City II on January 27, 2020. Barbir scored his first professional goal in his fourth appearance for the club on August 1, 2020, which ended up being the matchwinner in the 70th minute as Sporting Kansas City II defeated the Indy Eleven 1-0 at Lucas Oil Stadium. Following the 2021 season, Kansas City opted to declined their contract option on Barbir.

Oakland Roots
On January 18, 2022, Barbir signed with USL Championship club Oakland Roots.

International career
Barbir represented the United States at under-17 and under-19 level, and played with the former side at the 2015 FIFA U-17 World Cup in Chile where he was teammates with Christian Pulisic. As a junior, he had also been approached by Romania.

Career statistics

Club

Honors
United States U17 
CONCACAF Under-17 Championship third place: 2015

References

External links 
Danny Barbir at USSoccer.com

1998 births
Living people
Soccer players from Atlanta
American people of Cuban descent
American people of Romanian descent
American soccer players
Association football defenders
USL Championship players
Liga I players
Whitecaps FC 2 players
FC Astra Giurgiu players
SV Sandhausen players
Sporting Kansas City II players
Oakland Roots SC players
United States men's youth international soccer players
American expatriate soccer players
Expatriate footballers in Romania
American expatriate sportspeople in Romania
American expatriate soccer players in Germany
Sportspeople from Lehigh County, Pennsylvania